Norman George Fisher (9 July 1910 – 1 February 1972) was a British educationalist who was at various times Chief Education Officer for the English city of Manchester, head of the staff college of the National Coal Board, and chairman of the panel on the BBC Television question-and-answer show, The Brains Trust.

He appeared as a castaway on the BBC Radio programme Desert Island Discs on 10 August 1959.

References 

1910 births
1972 deaths
20th-century British educators
BBC television presenters
British civil servants
Educational administrators
Place of birth missing
Place of death missing